The Yilan Brick Kiln is a former brick manufacturing factory in Beijin Village, Yilan City, Yilan County, Taiwan.

History
In 1831, Yilan established its first own brick klin due to the discoveries of sites around Yilan which has high viscosity clay, which was suitable for bricks making. The Yilan Brick Kiln was originally established as Chen He Cheng Kiln Factory. It was later changed to Yilan Brick Kiln and ended its operation in the 1980s. In 1999, the Yilan County Government planned to build residential buildings within the area. However, after various oppositions from the local residents, the kiln was finally preserved.

Architecture
The kiln building is a rectangular shaped with a series of individual kilns. Each kiln can fire its own product and operate separately with exhaust holes connecting to each other with a unified exhaust pipe at the end. The kiln has a brick domed roof and a brick floor. The kiln features a 37-meter tall chimney.

Transportation
The building is accessible within walking distance north of Yilan Station of Taiwan Railways.

See also
 List of tourist attractions in Taiwan
 Former Tangrong Brick Kiln

References

1938 establishments in Taiwan
Buildings and structures in Yilan County, Taiwan
Kilns in Taiwan
Tourist attractions in Yilan County, Taiwan